Mari Eifring (born 19 January 1987, in Oslo) is a Norwegian politician of the Red Party. In 2012 she was elected the party's secretary. She was the leader of Red Youth from 2008 until 2010. She had been a member of Red Youth's Central Board since 2006.

References

External links
  Sosialisme.no

1987 births
Living people
Red Party (Norway) politicians
Politicians from Oslo
Norwegian socialist feminists